Hellerup IK or HIK is a Danish sport club from Hellerup. Their football team currently plays in the Danish 2nd Division.

HIK consists also of a handball and a tennis section.

Current squad

Out on loan

Achievements
4 seasons in the Highest Danish League
25 seasons in the Second Highest Danish League
39 seasons in the Third Highest Danish League

References

External links
Official club website
Official football section website

Hellerup IK
Football clubs in Denmark
Football clubs in Copenhagen
Association football clubs established in 1900
1900 establishments in Denmark
Sport in Gentofte Municipality